Don Bosco Matriculation Higher Secondary School is located in Egmore, Chennai. The school was established in July 1958 with 140 students and Fr. Mallon as the principal and has since grown to over 5000 students. This School was founded in 1959 as a Matriculation School affiliated with the University of Madras and it obtained its recognition vide letter p.A983 dated 19.3.1959. From 13th November 1978, it came under the jurisdiction and recognition of a separate Board of Matriculation Schools. On 1st July 1978, it was upgraded as a Higher Secondary School and recognition was granted to the Higher Secondary Section by the Director of School Education in his proceedings, D.Dis.No.75466/W5/78 dt. 2.4.1979. The school is affiliated to matriculation system of Tamil Nadu until class 10 and the Tamil Nadu State Board for classes 11 and 12.

Notable alumni
 Silambarasan, actor
 Prabhas, actor
 Viswanathan Anand, chess grandmaster and world champion
 Vijay Amritraj, Tennis Professional
 Y. Gee. Mahendra, actor
 Dinesh Karthik, Indian cricketer
 Arjan Kripal Singh, Indian cricketer
 Arvind Swamy, actor
 Daggubati Venkatesh, actor
 D. Imman, music composer
 Sibiraj, actor
 Vikram Prabhu, actor
 Vishal, actor
 Daggubati Suresh Babu, film producer
 Kuthethurshri Vasudevadas, cricketer
 Vijay Kumar, spiritual guru
 Keshav R Murugesh, business leader
 Dayanidhi Maran, politician
 Sanjay Pinto, business leader
 Sashi Kumar, media personality
 Kalanithi Maran, business man
Venu Srinivasan, businessman

References

External links
 School website
 
 Web Portal

 Primary section
 Youtube Channel 

 Past Pupils Association

DB Converge Global Alumni Meet, 2014 website

Boys' schools in India
Catholic schools in India
Christian schools in Tamil Nadu
Primary schools in Tamil Nadu
High schools and secondary schools in Chennai
Educational institutions established in 1958
1958 establishments in Madras State